George Frost (1754–1821) was an English landscape painter who lived in Ipswich, Suffolk, England.

Biography
Frost was the son of a builder at Ousden in Suffolk, and was originally brought up to his father's business. He subsequently obtained a post  in the office of the Blue Coach at Ipswich where he worked until about eight years before his death.

Career as an artist
Frost had a natural and early love of drawing, and was self-taught as an artist. According to his obituary in the Gentleman's Magazine:His productions, and more particularly his Drawings, were admirable, and exhibited abundant proofs of the character and genius of a Master. He studied nature with the closest attention, and in his attempts to delineate her beauties, was eminently successful. He was an accurate observer of her in all her appearances, and possessed a characteristic touch for all her forms. The subjects which he selected were such as did credit to his taste and judgment; and whatever came from his pencil bore the impress of originality and truth, and evinced, in a bold and masterly manner,the local character and features of the County In which he resided. He was a great admirer and imitator of Gainsborough, and possessed some paintings and drawings by him, notably "The Mall", of which he executed a careful copy when in his 77th year. He was also a close friend of John Constable. His employment at Ipswich caused him to limit his subjects to that town and its neighbourhood, and he was little known elsewhere.

Gallery

Death
Frost died at his home on the Common Quay at Ipswich on 28 June 1821  after a painful illness.

References

Sources

External links

 Paintings by George Frost

1754 births
1821 deaths
18th-century English painters
English male painters
19th-century English painters
People from the Borough of St Edmundsbury
English landscape painters
Artists from Ipswich
19th-century English male artists
18th-century English male artists